William Dodge Sample (March 9, 1898 – October 2, 1945) was a Rear Admiral in the United States Navy and an Escort Carrier Division commander in World War II. He was the youngest rear admiral in the Pacific Theater of World War II.

World War I and early career
Sample was born in Buffalo, New York and graduated from the United States Naval Academy at Annapolis, Maryland in June 1918.

During World War I, Sample served aboard the transport . For meritorious service during a fire onboard Henderson, he received a letter of commendation from the Secretary of the Navy. Detached in August 1918, he served on several destroyers based at Queenstown, Ireland. He remained in the European Waters Detachment after the end of World War I.

In December 1921, Sample was transferred to the gunboat  in the Asiatic Fleet.

Sample attended flight training at Naval Air Station Pensacola, Florida and was designated a Naval Aviator on June 23, 1923. Shortly thereafter, he served as Commanding Officer of Scouting Squadron VS-1.

His last duty before World War II was as Supervisor of Aviation Training at Naval Air Station, Pensacola, Florida.

World War II
At the outbreak of World War II, he assisted in the conversion of the oil tanker  into an escort carrier. Shortly thereafter, he was promoted to Commander. Assuming command of Santee on her commissioning, he was awarded a letter of commendation for service during Operation Torch; the invasion of North Africa.

In late summer 1944, Sample was promoted to rear admiral, planting his flag aboard the escort carrier  as Commander, Carrier Division 27 (CarDiv 27), for the invasion of Palau. In October 1944, at the Battle of Leyte Gulf, his CarDiv 27 was part of Task Unit 77.4.2 (TU 77.4.2, otherwise known as Taffy II) at the Battle off Samar under Rear Admiral Felix B. Stump. In early 1945, Commander, CarDiv 27, and Marcus Island supported the Invasion of Lingayen Gulf, Philippines.

During the Leyte invasion, Rear Admiral Sample "desired a better view of operations" and decided to hitch a ride in a torpedo bomber. He lay in the "tunnel gun" position and observed through the window below the tail. The plane was hit by antiaircraft. Sample was severely cut on the head and shoulders. James C. Edinger, ARM3c, USNR, of Foxburg, Pennsylvania), came down from the "blister" where he was manning a  machine gun, and applied first aid. Edinger said that it took them more than an hour to return to Marcus Island, during which he kept kicking Sample in the face with his foot to keep the Admiral from passing out. Sample was a big man: Edinger was afraid that if they ended up in the water, he would be unable to get him out of the plane. Each time Sample would warn Edinger to make sure the  machine gun in the tail was empty. He was afraid that when they landed the gun would go off. Later, in the state room Sample explained to Edinger that he could see the headlines in the paper, "Admiral lands upon carrier: shoots hole in deck". According to the ship's surgeon, Commander Lee,"the excellence of Edinger's treatment helped prevent infection". Admiral Sample was awarded the Purple Heart, and at Sample's request, Edinger was promoted to Aviation Radio Man, Second Class.

Awards
Sample received the Legion of Merit for his service as Commanding Officer of the Hornet on June 20, 1944.

Death
On October 2, 1945, shortly after the war ended, Sample was listed as missing after his Martin PBM Mariner aircraft failed to return from a familiarization flight near Wakayama, Japan. Rear Admiral Sample was officially declared dead on October 3, 1946. 
He was buried at Arlington National Cemetery, in Arlington, Virginia.

Family
He was married to Mary Lee Lamar of Pensacola, Florida. They had one daughter, Carolyn Lamar Sample who resides in Alexandria, Virginia, with her husband Amb. David M. Abshire.

Namesake ship
 The frigate  was commissioned on March 23, 1968.

Notes

Bibliography

External links

 

1898 births
1945 deaths
Aviators killed in aviation accidents or incidents in Japan
Burials at Arlington National Cemetery
Military personnel from Buffalo, New York
United States Naval Academy alumni
United States Naval Aviators
United States Navy personnel of World War I
United States Navy World War II admirals
United States Navy admirals
Victims of aviation accidents or incidents in 1945